Black Man of Steal is the seventh studio album of Israeli-American parody rapper Rucka Rucka Ali. The album was released January 13, 2015, and distributed by Pinegrove Records. It peaked at number 7 on the Billboard Top Comedy Albums.

Background 
Part of the album title, namely "Man of Steal", is a parody of the nickname for the DC superhero Superman: "Man of Steel". The quote on the bottom of the album cover is a parody of a similar line from Uncle Ben in Marvel's Spider-Man: "With great power comes great responsibility".

Track listing

Charts

References 

2015 albums
Rucka Rucka Ali albums
2010s comedy albums